Babushkin (masculine) or Babushkina (feminine) is a Russian surname derived from the word "", meaning "grandmother" or "elderly woman". Notable people with the surname include:

Andrei Babushkin (1964–2022), Russian sociologist and human rights activist
Ivan Babushkin (1873–1906), Russian politician and revolutionary
Mikhail Babushkin (1893–1938), Russian aviator and Hero of the Soviet Union
Olesya Babushkina (born 1989), Belarusian gymnast
Yefim Babushkin (1880–1927), Russian revolutionary

Russian-language surnames